The Dallas mayoral election of 2002 took place on January 19 and February 16, 2002, to elect the mayor of Dallas, Texas. It was triggered after Ron Kirk declared his intent to resign as mayor so he could focus on running in the 2002 United States Senate election in Texas.

The race was officially nonpartisan. Since no candidate secured a majority in the first round, a runoff was held between the top-two finishers. Laura Miller won the election.

Results

First round

Runoff

References

Dallas
Dallas
2002
Non-partisan elections
Dallas 2002
Dallas
2000s in Dallas